A list of notable politicians of the defunct Independent Social Democratic Party of Germany:

A
Karl Aderhold
Lore Agnes
Marie Ahlers
Martha Arendsee
Karl Artelt
Rosa Aschenbrenner
Siegfried Aufhäuser
Elise Augustat

B
Maria Backenecker
Bernhard Bästlein
Johannes R. Becher
Eduard Bernstein
Rudolf Breitscheid
Hermann Brill
Hans Brodmerkel
James Broh
Albert Buchmann

C
Arthur Crispien

D
Franz Dahlem
Ernst Däumig
Wilhelm Dittmann

E
Hugo Eberlein
Emil Eichhorn
Kurt Eisner
August Enderle

F
Alfred Faust
Max Fechner
Josef Felder
Hermann Fleissner
Wilhelm Florin
Paul Franken
Walter Freitag
Philipp Fries

G
Herta Geffke
Anna Geyer
Ernst Goldenbaum
Arthur Goldstein
Hugo Gräf
Gregor A. Gregorius
Otto Grotewohl
Karl Grünberg
Anton Grylewicz
Ketty Guttmann

H
Hugo Haase
Georg Ulrich Handke
Fritz Heckert
Alfred Henke
Carl Herz
Rudolf Hilferding
Max Hoelz
Adolf Hofer
Oskar Hoffmann
Martin Hoop

J
Mathilde Jacob
Hans Jendretzky

K
Karl Kautsky
Luise Kautsky
Hans Kippenberger
Erich Knauf
Bernard Koenen
Wilhelm Koenen
Olga Körner
Karl Korsch
Hedwig Krüger
Marie Kunert
Otto Kühne
Franz Künstler

L
Fritz Lange
Antonie Langendorf
Georg Ledebour
Rudolf Leonhard
Willy Leow
Paul Levi
Eugen Leviné
Alfred Levy
Theodor Liebknecht
Hermann Liebmann
Richard Lipinski
Kurt Löwenstein

M
Hans Marchwitza
Herbert Marcuse

N
Ernst Niekisch
Emmy Noether

P
Agnes Plum
Lothar Popp

R
Siegfried Rädel
Heinrich Rau
Bernhard Reichenbach
Minna Reichert
Anna Reitler
Hermann Remmele
Karl Retzlaw
Ernst Reuter
Julius Rosemann
Arthur Rosenberg
Kurt Rosenfeld
Katharina Roth

S
Willy Sachse
Willi Sänger
Werner Scholem
Hermann Schubert
Ernst Schwarz
Max Sievers
Max Silbermann
Gustav Sobottka
Fritz Soldmann
Siegmund Sredzki
Anna Stiegler
Karl Wilhelm Stolle
Heinrich Ströbel

T
Ernst Thälmann
Ernst Torgler
Kurt Tucholsky

U
Walter Ulbricht

W
Walter Weidauer
Mathilde Wurm

Z
Clara Zetkin
 Anna Ziegler
Luise Zietz
Fritz Zubeil

 
Independent Social Democratic Party of Germany